Matti Vuorinen (born 6 November 1948 in Turku) is a Finnish mathematician working in the area of classical analysis. His main topics of interest include geometric function theory, quasiregular and quasiconformal mappings, computational potential theory, and generalized hyperbolic geometry.

He has worked as a professor of mathematics at the University of Turku and University of Helsinki, Finland and supervised 13 PhD theses and more than a hundred MSc theses. Together with Olli Martio he organized the Helsinki Analysis Seminar three decades, in 1986–2016. With the grants of Academy of Finland and other grants he has hosted more than a hundred research/postdoc visits to Universities of Turku and Helsinki.

His network of coauthors includes 80 mathematicians from all corners of world: European countries, USA, Russia, China, India, Japan, New Zealand. His collaboration with this network includes more than 200 publications, including 3 books on quasiregular and quasiconformal mappings.

He has worked altogether more than five years at leading research institutions of his research area: The University of Michigan, Ann Arbor, Michigan, Technical University of Berlin, the Mittag-Leffler Institute, Sweden, Institute of Mathematics, Novosibirsk.

Selected publications
P. Hariri, R. Klén and M. Vuorinen: 
M. Vuorinen: 
G.D. Anderson, M.K. Vamanamurthy, M.K.  Vuorinen:

References

 Conformal Geometry and Quasiregular Mappings
 arXiv
 Scholar Google
 ResearchGate

1948 births
Living people
People from Turku
Academic staff of the University of Helsinki
20th-century  Finnish mathematicians
21st-century  Finnish mathematicians
University of Michigan faculty